The 2018 season was the Detroit Lions' 89th in the National Football League (NFL) and their first under a new coaching staff led by head coach Matt Patricia. With their loss to the Los Angeles Rams in Week 13, the Lions failed to improve on their 9–7 campaign from the season before. With their Week 15 loss to the Buffalo Bills, the Lions clinched their first losing season since 2015, making this also their first losing season in the post-Calvin Johnson era. They also missed the playoffs for the second consecutive season and finished last in the NFC North for the first time since 2012 with a 6–10 record.

Despite the disappointing season, the Lions were able to upset the defending back-to-back AFC and eventual Super Bowl Champion New England Patriots 26–10 during Week 3, marking their first win over the Patriots since 2000, which was also the first year of the Brady–Belichick era. The Lions were also able to sweep the Green Bay Packers for the second straight year.

Offseason

Coaching staff
 On January 1, the Lions fired head coach Jim Caldwell and assistant head coach/offensive line coach Ron Prince.
 On February 5, the day after Super Bowl LII, the Lions hired former New England Patriots defensive coordinator Matt Patricia as head coach.
 On February 7, the Lions hired David Corrao as Director of Football Research, Jeff Davidson as offensive line coach, George Godsey as quarterbacks coach, Al Golden as linebackers coach, Paul Pasqualoni as defensive coordinator, Brian Stewart as defensive backs coach and Chris White as tight ends coach.

Re-signings

Additions

Departures

Trades
 On May 3, the Lions traded defensive tackle Akeem Spence to the Miami Dolphins in exchange for a conditional seventh-round draft pick in the 2019 NFL Draft.
 On August 23, the Lions acquired linebacker Eli Harold from the San Francisco 49ers in exchange for a conditional seventh-round pick in the 2020 NFL Draft.
 On October 30, the Lions traded wide receiver Golden Tate to the Philadelphia Eagles in exchange for a third-round pick in the 2019 NFL Draft.

Draft

Draft trades
 The Lions traded their sixth-round selection (No. 194 overall) to the Los Angeles Rams in exchange for offensive tackle Greg Robinson.
 The Lions made two separate trades with the New England Patriots — trading their original second-round selection (No. 51 overall) and their fourth-round selection (No. 117 overall) to the Patriots in exchange for the Patriots' second-round selection (No. 43 overall); and acquiring a fourth-round selection (No. 114 overall) in exchange for a third-round selection in the 2019 draft.

Staff

Final roster

Schedule

Preseason

Regular season

Note: Intra-division opponents are in bold text.

Game summaries

Week 1: vs. New York Jets

The Lions opened the regular season at home, hosting the New York Jets on Monday Night Football. The Lions took an early lead in the first quarter when Quandre Diggs intercepted a Sam Darnold pass and ran it in from 37-yards, but the Jets quickly tied it up following a seven-yard touchdown run from Isaiah Crowell. In the second quarter, the Jets scored 10 more points via a 35-yard field goal by Jason Myers and a 41-yard touchdown pass from Darnold to Robby Anderson. The Lions scored the final points of the first half via a 21-yard field goal from Matt Prater, to make the score 17–10 in favor of the Jets at half-time. After the intermission, the Lions again tied the game following a 24-yard touchdown pass from Matthew Stafford to Golden Tate, for their only points of the second half. The Jets then scored 31 unanswered points for a runaway victory. First three touchdowns: a 21-yard reception by Quincy Enunwa, a 36-yard interception return by Darron Lee and a 78-yard punt return by Andre Roberts. After a 32-yard field goal by Jason Myers, the Jets capped off their lopsided win with a 62-yard run by Crowell, making the final score 48–17 in favor of New York.

Week 2: at San Francisco 49ers

In week 2, the Lions visited the San Francisco 49ers. The 49ers took an early lead in the first quarter via a 45-yard field goal by Robbie Gould. The Lions responded with a 30-yard touchdown pass from Matthew Stafford to Kenny Golladay, to take their first and only lead of the game. The 49ers scored 10 points in the second quarter via a four-yard touchdown pass from Jimmy Garoppolo to Kendrick Bourne and a 42-yard field goal from Gould. The Lions scored the final points of the first half via a 27-yard field goal from Matt Prater, to make the score 13–10 in favor of the 49ers at half-time. The 49ers scored 14 points in the third quarter via an 11-yard touchdown pass from Garoppolo to Garrett Celek and a 66-yard touchdown run from Matt Breida. The Lions then added a 43-yard field goal from Prater. The 49ers extended their lead in the fourth quarter via a 36-yard field goal from Gould. The Lions scored 14 points in the final quarter via a five-yard touchdown reception by Marvin Jones and a 15-yard touchdown reception by Michael Roberts, making the final score 30–27 in favor of San Francisco.

Week 3: vs. New England Patriots

In week 3, the Lions hosted the New England Patriots on Sunday Night Football. The Lions opened the scoring in the first quarter via a 38-yard field goal by Matt Prater to take a lead they never gave up. The Lions scored 10 points in the second quarter via a four-yard touchdown pass from Matthew Stafford to Kenny Golladay and a 25-yard field goal from Prater. The Patriots finally got on the board late in the quarter via a 36-yard field goal by Stephen Gostkowski, to make the score 13–3 in favor of the Lions at half-time. The teams exchanged touchdowns in the third quarter, first a 10-yard touchdown pass from Tom Brady to James White for the Patriots, then a 33-yard touchdown pass from Stafford to Marvin Jones for the Lions. The Lions extended their lead in the fourth quarter via two field goals from Prater, from 32-yards and 30-yards, respectively, making the final score 26–10 in favor of Detroit, for their first win of the season. This was the Lions' first victory over the Patriots since the 2000 season. Kerryon Johnson's 101 rushing yards marked the first time a Lions player rushed for over 100 yards in a game since Reggie Bush on Thanksgiving Day in 2013, ending the fourth-longest streak (70 games) without a 100-yard rusher in NFL history.

Week 4: at Dallas Cowboys

In week 4, the Lions donned all-silver uniforms and visited the Dallas Cowboys. Dallas opened the scoring in the first quarter via a 32-yard field goal from Brett Maher. Detroit responded with a 45-yard touchdown pass from Matthew Stafford to Golden Tate, to take their first lead of the game. In the second quarter, both teams scored a field goal, first a 43-yard field goal by Maher for the Cowboys, then a 33-yard field goal by Matt Prater for the Lions. The Cowboys regained the lead with a 38-yard touchdown pass from Dak Prescott to Ezekiel Elliott, to make the score 13–10 in favor of the Dallas at half-time. The only points of the third quarter was from Dallas via a one-yard touchdown pass from Prescott to Geoff Swaim. The Lions scored a pair of touchdowns in the fourth quarter while the Cowboys had a pair of field goals. First an eight-yard touchdown run from Kerryon Johnson for Detroit, then a 22-yard field goal from Maher for Dallas. The Lions took a one-point lead when Tate caught a 38-yard touchdown pass from Stafford, but the Cowboys won in the final seconds of the game with a 38-yard field goal by Maher.

Week 5: vs. Green Bay Packers

In week 5, the Lions hosted their divisional rival the Green Bay Packers. The Lions scored 24 unanswered points in the first half. First a pair of one-yard touchdown runs in the first quarter by LeGarrette Blount. The Lions added 10 points in the second quarter via a 39-yard field goal by Matt Prater and an eight-yard touchdown pass from Matthew Stafford to Marvin Jones, to make the score 24–0 in favor of the Lions at half-time. The Packers finally got on the board in the third quarter scoring 14 points via a three-yard touchdown pass from Aaron Rodgers to Marquez Valdes-Scantling, followed by a two-point conversion pass from Rodgers to Jamaal Williams and a one-yard touchdown pass from Rodgers to Lance Kendricks. In the fourth quarter, Detroit scored their only points of the second half via a five-yard touchdown pass from Stafford to Kenny Golladay. Green Bay added nine more points via a 12-yard touchdown pass from Rodgers to Davante Adams and a 41-yard field goal from Mason Crosby, making the final score 31–23 in favor of Detroit. Dating back to last season, it was the first time the Lions defeated the Packers three games in a row since they did so during the 1990 and 1991 seasons. They went into their bye week with a 2–3 record.

Week 7: at Miami Dolphins

In week 7, the Lions visited the Miami Dolphins. The Lions took an early lead in the first quarter, that they never gave back, following a 15-yard touchdown pass from Matthew Stafford to Michael Roberts. The Lions added 10 points in the second quarter, via a 29-yard field goal by Matt Prater and a two-yard touchdown run from LeGarrette Blount. Miami got on the board via a five-yard touchdown pass from Brock Osweiler to Kenny Stills, to make the score 17–7 in favor of the Lions at half-time. The Lions extended their lead in third quarter via a 28-yard field goal from Prater and a four-yard touchdown pass from Stafford to Roberts. The Dolphins responded with a 54-yard touchdown run by Kenyan Drake. The Lions added six points in the fourth quarter, via two field goals by Prater from 35-yards and 50-yards, respectively. The Dolphins responded with a 24-yard touchdown pass from Osweiler to Danny Amendola, making the final score 32–21 in favor of Detroit. This was the Lions' first road win of the season. The Lions rushed for 248 yards in the game, their highest rushing total since November 23, 1997.

Week 8: vs. Seattle Seahawks

In week 8, the Lions hosted the Seattle Seahawks. Detroit took an early lead in the first quarter via a 39-yard touchdown pass from Matthew Stafford to Marvin Jones, but Seattle tied it up in the second quarter via a 24-yard touchdown pass from Russell Wilson to Tyler Lockett and added 14 more points via a 15-yard touchdown pass from Wilson to David Moore and a 12-yard touchdown pass from Wilson to Ed Dickson, to make the score 21–7 in favor of the Seahawks at half-time. After a scoreless third quarter, Seattle extended their lead in the fourth quarter via a seven-yard touchdown run by Chris Carson. The Lions scored the game's final points with another touchdown pass from Stafford to Jones, this one for 19-yards, making the final score 28–14 in favor of Seattle.

Week 9: at Minnesota Vikings

In week 9, the Lions visited their divisional rival the Minnesota Vikings. The Vikings took an early lead in the first quarter via a one-yard touchdown run from Latavius Murray. The Lions responded in the second quarter with a pair of 35-yard field goals by Matt Prater. The Vikings extended their lead via a two-yard touchdown pass from Kirk Cousins to Adam Thielen and a 39-yard field goal by Dan Bailey, to make the score 17–6 in favor of Minnesota at half-time. After a scoreless third quarter, each team scored once in the fourth quarter. First a 32-yard fumble recovery for a touchdown by Danielle Hunter for the Vikings, then a 37-yard field goal by Prater for the Lions, making the final score 24–9 in favor of Minnesota.

Week 10: at Chicago Bears

In week 10, the Lions visited their divisional rival the Chicago Bears. The Bears scored 13 points in the first quarter via a three-yard touchdown run by Tarik Cohen and a 36-yard touchdown pass from Mitchell Trubisky to Allen Robinson. The Bears added another 13 points in the second quarter via a 45-yard touchdown pass from Trubisky to Anthony Miller and a four-yard touchdown run by Trubisky. The Lions finally got on the board just before the intermission via a one-yard touchdown run by Kerryon Johnson, to make the score 26–7 in favor of Chicago at half-time. The Lions opened the scoring in the second half with a 52-yard field goal by Matt Prater. The Bears extended their lead in the third quarter via a 26-yard touchdown pass from Trubisky to Robinson, followed by a two-point conversion pass from Trubisky to Trey Burton. In the fourth quarter, the Lions scored 12 points via a five-yard touchdown pass from Matthew Stafford to Kenny Golladay and a 13-yard touchdown pass from Stafford to Johnson, making the final score 34–22 in favor of Chicago.

Week 11: vs. Carolina Panthers

In week 11, the Lions hosted the Carolina Panthers. The Panthers took an early lead in the first quarter via a one-yard touchdown pass from Cam Newton to Greg Olsen. The Lions responded with an eight-yard touchdown run from Kerryon Johnson to tie the game. The Lions scored the only points of the second quarter via a 54-yard field goal from Matt Prater, to make the score 10–7 in favor of the Lions at half-time. The Lions extended their lead in the third quarter via a 32-yard field goal by Prater. In the fourth quarter, the Panthers responded with a 12-yard touchdown pass from Newton to Curtis Samuel to tie the game, however, the Lions regained the lead via a 19-yard touchdown pass from Matthew Stafford to Kenny Golladay. Carolina scored another touchdown via an eight-yard pass from Newton to D. J. Moore, then attempted to take the lead with a two-point conversion but failed, making the final score 20–19 in favor of Detroit.

Week 12: vs. Chicago Bears

In week 12, the Lions donned retro-style uniforms and hosted a Thanksgiving Day rematch with their division rival the Chicago Bears. After a scoreless first quarter, the Lions got on the board first in the second quarter via a four-yard touchdown run by LeGarrette Blount. The Bears responded with a 40-yard field goal by Cody Parkey and a 10-yard touchdown pass from Chase Daniel to Taquan Mizzell, to make the score 9–7 in favor of Chicago at half-time. Detroit scored the only points of the third quarter via a four-yard touchdown run from Blount, to put the Lions up by four points. In the fourth quarter, however, the Bears took a three-point lead via a 14-yard touchdown pass from Daniel to Tarik Cohen, but the Lions quickly tied it up via a 20-yard field goal by Matt Prater. The Bears regained the lead via a 41-yard interception return by Eddie Jackson, making the final score 23–16 in favor of Chicago.

Week 13: vs. Los Angeles Rams

In week 13, the Lions hosted the Los Angeles Rams. The Rams opened the scoring in the first quarter via a 24-yard field goal from Greg Zuerlein. The Lions tied it up in the second quarter via a 28-yard field goal by Matt Prater. The Rams then scored ten more points via an eight-yard touchdown pass from Jared Goff to Robert Woods and a 47-yard field goal by Zuerlein to make the half–time score 13–3 in favor of Los Angeles. Both teams scored a field goal in the third quarter, first a 29-yard field goal by Prater for the Lions, then a 48-yard field goal by Zuerlein for the Rams. The Lions reduced the Rams' lead to three points via a 11-yard touchdown pass from Matthew Stafford to Taylor Decker. The Rams responded with 14 points in the fourth quarter via two touchdown runs from Todd Gurley, from 13-yards and two-yards, respectively. The Lions added a 35-yard field goal from Prater, making the final score 30–16 in favor of Los Angeles.

Week 14: at Arizona Cardinals

In week 14, the Lions visited the Arizona Cardinals. After a scoreless first quarter, the Lions scored the only points of the first half via a 47-yard field goal by Matt Prater, to make the score 3–0 in favor of the Lions at half-time. The Lions extended their lead in the third quarter via a 67-yard interception return by Darius Slay. In the fourth quarter, the Cardinals finally got on the board via a 22-yard field goal by Zane Gonzalez to avoid a shutout. The Lions added to their lead with a one-yard run by Zach Zenner to make the final score 17–3 in favor of the Lions. This was the Lions' first win in Arizona since 1993.

Week 15: at Buffalo Bills

In week 15, the Lions visited the Buffalo Bills. After a scoreless first quarter, the Lions opened the scoring in the second quarter via a four-yard touchdown pass from Matthew Stafford to Andy Jones. Buffalo responded with a three-yard touchdown run by Josh Allen. The Lions replied with a one-yard touchdown run by Zach Zenner to make the score 13–7 in favor of the Lions at half-time. After a scoreless third quarter, the Bills scored the only points of the second half via a 42-yard touchdown pass from Allen to Robert Foster. The Lions' attempted comeback failed when Matt Prater missed a 45-yard field goal in the fourth quarter, making the final score 14–13 in favor of the Bills. With the loss, the Lions were eliminated from playoff contention.

Week 16: vs. Minnesota Vikings

In week 16, the Lions played their final home game of the season when they hosted a rematch with their divisional rival the Minnesota Vikings. The Lions opened the scoring in the first quarter via a 47-yard field goal by Matt Prater and extended their lead in the second quarter via two field goals by Prater, from 35-yardsand 48-yards, respectively. The Vikings responded with two touchdowns, an eight-yard touchdown pass from Kirk Cousins to Stefon Diggs and a 44-yard Hail Mary pass from Cousins to Kyle Rudolph as time expired in the first half, to make the score 14–9 in favor of the Vikings at half-time. The Vikings held the Lions scoreless in the second half and extended their lead in the third quarter via a 24-yard field goal by Dan Bailey, then added 10 more points in the fourth quarter via a four-yard touchdown pass from Cousins to Rudolphand a 29-yard field goal by Bailey, making the final score 27–9 in favor of Minnesota. With the loss, the Lions fell to 5–10 and secured a last place finish in NFC North for the first time since 2012.

Week 17: at Green Bay Packers

To end the season, the Lions visited their divisional rival the Green Bay Packers for a rematch of week 5. The Lions opened the scoring in the first quarter via a five-yard touchdown pass from Matthew Stafford to T. J. Jones. The Lions added 14 points in the second quarter via an eight-yard touchdown pass on a fake field goal attempt from Matt Prater to Levine Toilolo and a 13-yard touchdown run by Zach Zenner, to make the score 21–0 in favor of the Lions at half-time. Detroit scored twice in the second half, first via a 43-yard field goal by Prater in the third quarter, then via a 23-yard touchdown pass from Stafford to Jones in the fourth quarter, to make the final score 31–0 in favor of the Lions, giving them their only shutout win of the season and a 6–10 record. This was also the Lions' first shutout against the Packers since 1973, the first shutout against the Packers in Green Bay since 1970, the first shutout for the Lions since 1996, and their first four-game winning streak against them since the 1982 and 1983 seasons. They also swept the Packers for the second consecutive season.

Standings

Division

Conference

References

External links
 

Detroit
Detroit Lions seasons
Detroit Lions